Gary Hadd (born October 19, 1965) is a former American football defensive tackle. He played for the Detroit Lions in 1988 and for the Phoenix Cardinals in 1989.

References

1965 births
Living people
Players of American football from Saint Paul, Minnesota
American football defensive tackles
Minnesota Golden Gophers football players
Detroit Lions players
Phoenix Cardinals players